Leo A. Seltzer (April 5, 1903 – January 30, 1978) is generally credited as the creator of the sport of roller derby, and was the founder and head of the original Roller Derby league from 1935 until his son Jerry Seltzer took over the business in 1958.

Early life
Seltzer was born in Helena, Montana on April 5, 1903.

Seltzer attended Lincoln High School in Portland, Oregon where he was a member of the school's basketball team. He competed in the amateur and semi-pro basketball circuits in Portland after high school.

As a young adult, Seltzer was in the motion picture distributing field with the Universal film company. This eventually led him to own a chain of struggling movie theaters in Oregon.

In 1929, after observing the popularity of cash prize-awarding dance marathons among out-of-work contestants and spectators, Seltzer sought ways to capitalize on the trend. In 1931, he helped organize and promote "walkathon"s, which at that time was another name for dance marathons, since most dancers ended up merely shuffling around for the duration of the contests, which could run as long as 40 days. His first commercial walkathon was held in Denver, Colorado, with twenty-two more to follow, including events at the Lotus Isle amusement park in Portland, Oregon. He grossed $2 million before retiring, citing that the events had become "vulgar."

Seltzer moved his family to Chicago in 1933, and began booking events into the Chicago Coliseum, a fortress-like structure at 15th & Wabash.

Transcontinental Roller Derby
Sometime in early 1935, Leo read an article in Literary Digest magazine that said ninety-three percent of Americans roller skated at one time or another during their lives.  Discussing the article with some of the regulars at Ricketts, a restaurant in Chicago's Near North Side, Seltzer was challenged to come up with a sport utilizing roller skating participants.

Bicycle races and dance marathons were very popular at the time, and in previous decades there had been successful 24-hour and multi-day roller skating races, at least one of which was called a "roller derby" in the press.

Seltzer began jotting ideas onto the tablecloth, incorporating these popular entertainment forms with a roller skating theme. The name Roller Derby was trademarked on July 14, 1935 (No. 336652), and on August 13, 1935, twenty thousand spectators filled the Chicago Coliseum to see 'Colonel' Leo Seltzer's Transcontinental Roller Derby, a mythical marathon race from one end of the country to the other which incorporated both male and female participants on a banked track.

Seltzer's decision to use women was a double-edged sword for the sport, since it guaranteed a large female audience at a sporting event, but the presence of women athletes made the mainstream press view Roller Derby as a sideshow, not a legitimate sport.  The premier race in Chicago was a tremendous success, but subsequent engagements throughout the country were not as successful, and Seltzer's entire enterprise almost ended with a tragic bus crash in 1937 when nineteen members of a touring group of Roller Derby skaters and support personnel were killed.  The number 1 was never worn again in Roller Derby, as a tribute to Joe Kleats and the other skaters who died in the crash.

In December 1937, sportswriter Damon Runyon saw the game in Coral Gables Florida, became enthralled, and with Leo Seltzer created a more structured game with more contact between the skaters and a new version of Roller Derby was created.  Seltzer's game and traveling troupe of skaters evolved and continued to have moderate growth, but it was not until November 29, 1948, when Roller Derby, broadcast on television from New York City's 69th Regiment Armory, captivated the nation.  Roller Derby was finally the smash hit Leo Seltzer had always envisioned, although within a few years, the sport was overexposed on TV, the brand new medium that had catapulted it to prominence.

Roller Derby's fluctuating popularity

With dwindling attendance, Roller Derby left America to tour Europe in 1953, but returned the following year.  Seltzer moved the headquarters to the West Coast, a few years before major league baseball would make the same move.  Leo never lost his vision that the game would once again be embraced by the country, but by 1958, it was time for son Jerry to take over day-to-day operation of the family business.  Jerry Seltzer (born June 3, 1932), once again took the sport to great heights by syndicating Roller Derby telecasts, featuring the San Francisco Bay Bombers, which were shown on a network of 120 TV stations across the country.  Roller Derby broadcasts beat all competition in most markets.

Derby's national tour became so successful that by 1969, the Bay Bombers were broken up into a San Francisco and Oakland team. These two units filled arenas across the country from 1969 through 1971, when a third unit was added.

Leo Seltzer lived to see his game once again break attendance records all over the country and become the darling of the mainstream press under Jerry's guardianship. However, the original Roller Derby skated its last game on December 8, 1973, when Jerry closed the family business.

Leo was married to Rose Weinstein Seltzer from 1926 to 1942 when she died from breast cancer.  Their two children were Gloria (born May 23, 1929) and Jerry. From April 19, 1942 to December 11, 1944, Seltzer was married to Lois Reynolds Atkins. Atkins had been employed by Seltzer as the manager of his Arcadia Roller Rink in Chicago. When she married, Atkins turned over management of the rink to a relative named Phil Hayes, but she continued to draw income from a concession business she operated there. One month after their marriage, Seltzer turned over operation of the rink to Atkins and a partner, Fred Morelli. In late 1943, Seltzer asked Atkins to transfer her half of the partnership to him, but she refused. In January 1944, Seltzer colluded with Hayes to overdraw the Atkins-Morelli partnership's account. The partnership was then replaced by one in which Atkins, Morelli, Seltzer and Sol Morelli had equal interests. Atkins claimed, in a 1950 lawsuit disputing her income taxes, that Seltzer, seeking to evade taxes, only allowed her into the new partnership after she agreed, in writing, to deposit her earnings into a joint bank account the two of them shared for payment of living expenses. She filed for divorce two months after the partnership was formed, and the divorce was granted that December.

Death, honors, and hope
Leo Seltzer died January 30, 1978. In 2005, during the 70th anniversary celebration of the first Transcontinental Roller Derby, Seltzer posthumously became the first inductee into the Executive Wing of the National Roller Derby Hall of Fame in Chicago. His son Jerry, was inducted at the same celebration.

Leo Seltzer had always wanted roller derby to be a legitimate sport and to be in the Olympics.  His son Jerry said that with the recent grassroots movement of roller derby, including the advent of WFTDA, he thinks roller derby can now be an Olympic sport.

Madison Knisley is his only known relative currently involved in Roller Derby. She is a part of the San Marcos River Rollers.

See also
 History of roller derby

References

Roller derby
Sportspeople from Helena, Montana
1903 births
1978 deaths
Lincoln High School (Portland, Oregon) alumni
Jewish American sportspeople
20th-century American Jews